The Bourbon Iron Works, near Owingsville in Bath County, Kentucky, date from 1791.  The works was listed on the National Register of Historic Places in 1976.

It was the first of six blast furnaces built in this area for the smelting of iron ore.  Only the blast furnace stack survives.

References

External links

Blast furnaces in the United States
Historic American Engineering Record in Kentucky
Industrial buildings and structures on the National Register of Historic Places in Kentucky
Industrial buildings completed in 1791
National Register of Historic Places in Bath County, Kentucky
1791 establishments in Virginia
Pre-statehood history of Kentucky